Pine Hill Historic District is a national historic district located at Pine Hill, Ulster County, New York. It encompasses 125 contributing buildings, 3 contributing sites, 2 contributing structures, and 1 contributing object in the hamlet of Pine Hill.  It developed between about 1800 and 1962 and includes notable examples of Greek Revival, Carpenter Gothic (Gothic Revival), Italianate, Stick Style, Second Empire, Queen Anne, Colonial Revival, Classical Revival, and Bungalow / American Craftsman architecture. Located in the district are the separately listed District School No. 14, Elm Street Stone Arch Bridge, Mill Street Stone Arch Bridge, Morton Memorial Library, and Ulster House Hotel.  Other notable contributing resources include the John C. Loomis House (c. 1855), Methodist Episcopal Church (c. 1860), Benjamin Franklin Cornish House (c. 1860), Elizabeth Smith House (1876), Orchard Park House (1882), and "The Zepher" (c. 1895).

It was listed on the National Register of Historic Places in 2012.

References

Historic districts on the National Register of Historic Places in New York (state)
Greek Revival architecture in New York (state)
Gothic Revival architecture in New York (state)
Italianate architecture in New York (state)
Second Empire architecture in New York (state)
Queen Anne architecture in New York (state)
Neoclassical architecture in New York (state)
Colonial Revival architecture in New York (state)
Historic districts in Ulster County, New York
National Register of Historic Places in Ulster County, New York